Working America is the political organizing arm of the AFL–CIO. Its membership is made up of non-union individuals. It is the largest non-union workers' group in the United States, with a self-reported membership of 3.2 million individuals. Working America advocates for progressive policy issues. The organization recruits people in working-class neighborhoods on their doorsteps in an effort to persuade them to support labor-backed candidates at election time.

Overview
The organization started as a  two-state pilot project of the AFL–CIO in 2003. The organization was launched nationally that fall. The organization's founding director was Karen Nussbaum.

In October 2005, the organization announced that it had enrolled 1 million members. It reported a membership of 2.5 million by the fall of 2008.

Campaigns
Working America undertook its first nationwide activities in the 2004 U.S. presidential election. It organized a "Show Us The Jobs" bus tour of workers throughout the Midwest. The tour was critical of President George W. Bush's policies.

Working America was active in the 2006 midterm congressional elections. Working America activists were credited by the press and Democrats for helping to deliver federal and state victories in Ohio and Pennsylvania.

In 2007, Working America began a campaign to build support for universal health care. The group established a "Health Care Hustle" website on which consumers could post stories about how lack of health insurance or under-insurance led to significant financial, health or other problems. Working America promised to launch a campaign against the organization or corporation which received the most "horror stories." The effort built upon a previous campaign by Working America in mid-2006 in which the organization asked the public to submit stories about "bad bosses."

In 2015, Working America led a "massive get-out-the-vote effort" to elect Democrat Jack Conway as Governor of Kentucky. Conway was defeated by Republican Matt Bevin.

Policy positions
Working America opposes social security privatization. It supports the Affordable Care Act and Medicaid expansion. The organization advocates for an increased minimum wage and universal health care.

References

External links

 
 Working America at OpenSecrets.org

AFL–CIO
2003 establishments in the United States
Trade unions in the United States
Trade unions established in 2003
Workers' rights organizations